The canton of Val de Save is an administrative division of the Gers department, southwestern France. It was created at the French canton reorganisation which came into effect in March 2015. Its seat is in Samatan.

It consists of the following communes:
 
Betcave-Aguin
Bézéril
Cadeillan
Castillon-Savès
Cazaux-Savès
Espaon
Garravet
Gaujac
Gaujan
Labastide-Savès
Lahas
Laymont
Lombez
Monblanc
Mongausy
Montadet
Montamat
Montégut-Savès
Montpézat
Nizas
Noilhan
Pébées
Pellefigue
Polastron
Pompiac
Puylausic
Sabaillan
Saint-André
Saint-Élix-d'Astarac
Saint-Lizier-du-Planté
Saint-Loube
Saint-Soulan
Samatan
Sauveterre
Sauvimont
Savignac-Mona
Seysses-Savès
Simorre
Tournan
Villefranche

References

Cantons of Gers